Montecito may refer to:

 Montecito, Burnaby, a neighbourhood in Burnaby, British Columbia, Canada
 Montecito, California, a census-designated place in Santa Barbara County, California
 Montecito (processor), the codename used to designate a revision of the Intel Itanium 2 processor

See also
 Montecito Casino, the fictional Montecito Resort and Casino in the popular television series Las Vegas
 The Montecito Picture Company, a film production company